Tangerine Records is a UK-based independent record label founded in 1992 by musician Paul Bevoir, music journalist Chris Hunt and marketing executive John Ashworth.

History
Launching with a compilation of previously released material by The Jetset, throughout the 1990s the label specialised in reissuing CDs of collectable vinyl recordings, focusing on the mod, psychedelic, power pop and bubblegum pop genres. Acts released by the label have included The Jetset, The Moment, Direct Hits, Squire, The Cleaners From Venus, Dee Walker, Paul Bevoir and The V.I.P.'s.

Many of their early releases were showcased on the Tangerine Records compilation Come On Peel The Noise. The compilation also included several bands who did not have complete albums released on the label, such as Smalltown Parade, Mood Six, Melvyn and the Smartees and The Candees.

The label was refocused in 2004, moving away from the crowded re-issues market and it began to release newly recorded material, including a series of albums and singles by the band Rinaldi Sings.

Discography
 The Jetset: The Best Of The Jetset (Tang CD1) 1992
 Paul Bevoir: The Happiest Days Of Your Life (Tang CD2) 1992
 The Cleaners From Venus: Golden Cleaners (Tang CD3) 1993
 Squire: Big Smashes (Tang CD4) 1992
 The Jetset: The Best Of The Jetset Too! (Tang CD5) 1993
 Dee Walker: Jump Back (Tang CD6) 1993
 Squire: Get Ready To Go (Tang CD7) 1994
 Paul Bevoir: Dumb Angel (Tang CD8) 1994
 Direct Hits: The Magic Attic (Tang CD9) 1995
 The Moment: Mod Gods (Tang CD10) 1996
 Various Artists: Come On Peel The Noise (Tang CD11) 1995
 The VIPS: Beat Crazy (Tang CD12) 1997
 The Cleaners From Venus: Back From The Cleaners (Tang CD14) 1995
 Rinaldi Sings: "Avenues And Alleyways" single (Tang CDS015) 2004
 Rinaldi Sings: What's It All About? (Tang CD016) 2005
 Rinaldi Sings: "Come Fly With Me" single (Tang CDS017) 2005
 Rinaldi Sings: Bingo (Tang CD018) 2008

See also
 List of record labels
 Tangerine Records (disambiguation)

External links
Official Tangerine Records site
Official Rinaldi Sings site

Notes 

Record labels established in 1992
British independent record labels
Reissue record labels
Pop record labels